Canvas is a 2010 Indian Malayalam-language film directed by Shaji-Rajasekharan starring Kalabhavan Mani, Kannan and Altara.

Plot 
Manaf Hussain (Kalabhavan Mani) is a painter cum dramatist. Ramu (Kannan) is his assistant. Madhuri (Vidya) is a Bollywood star who has found inspiration in their play and has agreed to be a part of it. The story that Manaf decides to adapt for the stage is that of Yayathi's, the celebrated king of the Lunar dynasty who falls in love with both Devayani and Sharmishta. The movie talks about the relevance of the story and how it could serve as a metaphor for the modern times.

Cast
 Kalabhavan Mani as Manaf Hussain
 Jagathy Sreekumar
 Kannan as Ramu
 Althara
 Salim Kumar
 Boban Alummoodan as Baburaj
 Indrans
 Machan Varghese
 Mala Aravindan
 Meghanathan
 K. P. A. C. Lalitha
 Sajitha Betti

References

External links 

 
 http://www.bharatstudent.com/cafebharat//movie_reviews_2-Malayalam-Canvas_-Movie-Review-4,1164.php
 https://web.archive.org/web/20120407115156/http://popcorn.oneindia.in/title/5859/canvas.html

2010 films
2010s Malayalam-language films